Pok & Mok is a French animated series produced by Gaumont Animation and Vivement Lundi.

Characters
Pok – One of Mok's best friends, is an eight-year-old, short-haired gibbon.
Mok – A regular eight-year-old kid, one of Pok's best friends. He aspires to become the President of the World, Fireman Gangster and "The Most Famous Toilet Trout Fisherman in the House".
Camila – A nine-year-old girl and friend to both Mok and Pok. Camila has orange hair. In one episode she tries to kiss Mok.
Piggles – a talking, green-cheek conure.
Penelope – Mok's mother, a carefree, optimistic daydreamer.
Ernest – Mok's father, civil servant of the Ministry of Paperwork. Relaxed on the surface, he is secretly ridden with anxiety. He is an extremely organized and clean person.
Grandfather − Mok's grandfather is 60 years old and still working on his farm with his wife. He breeds animals and grows fruits and vegetables with much pesticide. He loves his work and practices intensive farming. He complains and rebels against everything. He has little appreciation for his son-in-law, who is also a farmer and offers occasionally rude commentary. He called Ernesto a "city boy".
Grandmother − Mok's grandmother is also 60 years old. She is happy to have everyone in the house, especially her daughter and her family. Although she has animals on the farm, none of them are real pets, so she is very happy to be home. She considers them to be her own "kitten". She is very dedicated and friendly. She speaks her mind without thinking about the consequences.

Episodes

Series overview

Pilot (2009)
A pilot episode was released in 2009.

Season 1 (2011)

Season 2 (2011)

Broadcast
It aired in Canada on UnisTV.

References

External links
 Pok & Mok at Gaumont Animation
 Pok & Mok at Vivement Lundi!

2000s French animated television series
2010s French animated television series
2009 French television series debuts
2014 French television series endings
French children's animated comedy television series
French flash animated television series
Animated television series about children